Rostam is a legendary hero in Persian mythology.

Rostam may also refer to:

Places

 Rostam County, Fars Province, Iran
 Rostam, Sistan and Baluchestan, Iran

People 
 Rostam (name)
 Rostam Farrokhzād, 7th century Iranian dynast
 Rostam Batmanglij (born 1983), American singer-songwriter

Other uses
 , later Iranian frigate Sabalan

See also
 Rostami (disambiguation)
 Rustom (disambiguation)
 Rustum (disambiguation)
 Rostam and Sohrab (opera), by Loris Tjeknavorian
 DRDO Rustom, an unmanned aerial vehicle